Funkadelic is the debut album by the American funk rock band Funkadelic, released in 1970 on Westbound Records.

Background
The group that would become Funkadelic was formed by George Clinton in 1964, as the unnamed backing section for his doo wop group The Parliaments.  Funkadelic signed to Westbound in 1968. Around this time, the group's music evolved from soul and doo wop into a harder guitar-driven mix of psychedelic rock, soul and funk, much influenced by the popular musical (and political) movements of the time. Jimi Hendrix, Sly Stone, The MC5, and Vanilla Fudge were major inspirations. The band made their first live television performance on Say Brother on October 7, 1969. They played a jam with songs "Into My Own Thing", "What Is Soul?", "(I Wanna) Testify", "I Was Made to Love Her" (a Stevie Wonder cover), "Friday Night, August 14th" and "Music for My Mother".

On the group's self-titled debut, the credits listed organist Mickey Atkins plus Clinton, Tiki Fulwood, Eddie Hazel, Billy "Bass" Nelson, and Tawl Ross. The recording also included the rest of the Parliaments singers (still uncredited because of contractual concerns), several uncredited session musicians then employed by Motown, as well as Ray Monette (of Rare Earth) and future P-Funk mainstay Bernie Worrell.

Reception and legacy 

In conjunction with the release of Funkadelic, Westbound Records circulated a promotional single called "Focus on Funkadelic" to radio stations. The single features six snippets of tracks from the LP.

According to critic Robert Christgau, Funkadelics "dark, slow, tuneless" music was originally panned and "scared the bejesus out of fans of upful blackness on both sides of America's widening racial divide". Writing in Christgau's Record Guide: Rock Albums of the Seventies (1981), Christgau jokingly referred to Clinton as "someone from Carolina who encountered eternity on LSD and vowed to contain it in a groove." Years later, Christgau rated the album as "a prequel to Sly and the Family Stone's depressive There's a Riot Goin' On". Mojo later hailed Funkadelic as "the best blues-influenced, warped acid rock you're likely to hear", and The Mojo Collection (2007) called it the band's first album of "spaced-out psychedelic funk". AllMusic's Jason Birchmeier said the recordings are "essentially conventional soul songs in the spirit of Motown or Stax -- steady rhythms, dense arrangements, choruses of vocals -- but with a loud, overdriven, fuzzy guitar lurking high in the mix". He deemed the album "a revealing and unique record that's certainly not short on significance, clearly marking the crossroads between '60s soul and '70s funk".

"I'll Bet You" was later covered by The Jackson 5 on their album ABC, and sampled by the Beastie Boys for their song "Car Thief". The 2005 CD reissue also contains their version of "Can't Shake It Loose", which was recorded two years prior by Diana Ross & The Supremes on their album Love Child. In more recent years, The Red Hot Chili Peppers have combined the main riff of "Mommy, What's a Funkadelic?" and certain parts of the lyrics from "What Is Soul?" in live shows, a version which appears as a B-Side on their 2002 single "By the Way".

Singles
I'll Bet You got to No. 22 on the US Billboard Hot Soul Songs chart. I Got a Thing, You Got a Thing, Everybody's Got a Thing also reached No. 30 on the US Billboard Hot Soul Songs chart.

Track listing

Personnel

Funkadelic 
Eddie Hazel – lead guitar, backing vocals on "Mommy, What's What's A Funkadelic?"; vocals on "I Bet You" & "Can't Shake It Loose", all Lead Vocals on "Open Our Eyes"; bridge vocals on "I Got a Thing"
Lucius "Tawl" Ross – rhythm guitar
Ramon "Tiki" Fulwood – drums on (1, 2, 4, 5, 6, 7, 9, 13)
Billy "Bass" Nelson – bass guitar on (3, 4, 6); backing vocals; lead vocals on "Good Old Music"
Mickey Atkins – Hammond organ on (5, 6, 7)

The Parliaments 
George Clinton – lead vocals on "Mommy, What's A Funkadelic?" & "What is Soul", vocal on "Can't Shake It Loose"
Clarence "Fuzzy" Haskins – vocals on "I Bet You" and "Good Old Music"
Calvin Simon – lead vocals on "Qualify and Satisfy"; vocals on "I Bet You" and "Can't Shake It Loose"
Ray Davis – vocals on "I Bet You"
Grady Thomas – vocals on "I Bet You"

Additional musicians 
Ray Monette – guitar on (2, 4, 9)
Bob Babbitt – bass guitar on (1, 2, 9)
Bernie Worrell – Hammond organ on (4)
Earl Van Dyke – Hammond organ on (2, 9)
Brad Innis – drums on (3)
Gasper Lawal – conga on (3)
Herb Sparkman – lead vocals on "Music for My Mother"
Hot Buttered Soul – additional backing vocals

Production 
Produced by George Clinton
Engineering by Milan Bogden, Russ Terrana, Ed Wolfrum, Bryan Dombrowski
The Graffiteria – artwork

Charts

References

1970 debut albums
Westbound Records albums
Funkadelic albums
Albums produced by George Clinton (funk musician)